is a part of the town of Hamatonbetsu, located in Esashi District, Sōya Subprefecture, Hokkaido, Japan.

 is a public three-year junior high school.

References

Populated places in Hokkaido